WMRX-FM (97.7 FM) is a radio station licensed to Beaverton, Michigan in the United States, broadcasting a classic hits format. In January 2021, the station began branding as "Mid-Michigan's Favorite Hits". The station also is an affiliate of the Detroit Tigers Radio Network. Black Diamond Broadcasting is the owner of WMRX-FM.

WMRX History
 
Originally WGEO-FM, the station was purchased by Maines Broadcasting in December 1983 and became WMRX-FM. The station ran an automated adult contemporary format from 1983 through 1990. The music was a more contemporary version of the MOR format of sister station WMPX. In the summer of 1990, WMRX became a direct simulcast of WMPX, and later in the year both stations became an affiliate of ABC Radio's "Star Station" adult contemporary format. Steel Broadcasting purchased the stations in 1992 retaining the "Star Station" format. In late 1994, the stations changed format to adult standards and were branded as "Unforgettable" airing ABC's "Stardust" format to great success. The stations stayed with ABC as the format morphed into "Timeless Favorites" in the early 2000s. In 2010, when ABC dropped the "Timeless" format, the stations became an affiliate of Dial Global's "America's Best Music" adult standards format. In January 2014, the stations dropped the satellite format and became "Sunny 97-7" airing a soft gold format. By 2017, competitor WHNN had changed format to AC, and the simulcast with WMPX shifted to classic hits, while retaining the Sunny brand, with a new logo. 

In 2019, WMRX broke simulcast with WMPX, as WMPX added a translator on 107.7 and became Country Gold "107-7 The Highway" featuring a 1990s-based classic country format. The station is branded as "Country's Greatest Hits."

References

Michiguide.com - WMRX-FM History

External links

MRX-FM
Gladwin County, Michigan
Radio stations established in 1995